Alligatorinae is a subfamily within the family Alligatoridae that contains the alligators and their closest extinct relatives, and is the sister taxon to Caimaninae (the caimans). Many genera in Alligatorinae are described, but only the genus Alligator is still living, with the remaining genera extinct.

Evolution
Alligators and caimans split in North America during the early Tertiary or late Cretaceous (about 53 million to about 65 million years ago). The Chinese alligator split from the American alligator about 33 million years ago and likely descended from a lineage that crossed the Bering land bridge during the Neogene. The modern American alligator is well represented in the fossil record of the Pleistocene. The alligator's full mitochondrial genome was sequenced in the 1990s. The full genome, published in 2014, suggests that the alligator evolved much more slowly than mammals and birds.

Phylogeny
Alligatorinae is cladistically defined as Alligator mississippiensis (the American alligator) and all species closer to it than to Caiman crocodylus (the spectacled caiman). This is a stem-based definition for Alligatorinae, and means that it includes more basal extinct alligator ancestors that are more closely related to living alligators than to caimans.

The below cladogram shows the phylogeny of Alligatorinae.

Taxonomy
 Subfamily Alligatorinae
 Genus Alligator
 † Alligator hailensis
 † Alligator mcgrewi
 † Alligator mefferdi
 Alligator mississippiensis, American alligator
 † Alligator olseni
 † Alligator prenasalis
 Alligator sinensis, Chinese alligator
 † Alligator thomsoni
 Genus † Allognathosuchus
 Genus † Arambourgia
 Genus † Ceratosuchus
 Genus † Chrysochampsa
 Genus † Eoalligator
 Genus † Hassiacosuchus
 Genus † Krabisuchus
 Genus † Navajosuchus?
 Genus † Procaimanoidea
 Genus † Wannaganosuchus

References

Alligatoridae
Selandian first appearances
Extant Paleocene first appearances
Taxa named by John Edward Gray
Reptile subfamilies